Marko Neloski (born 06 June 1996) is a retired Macedonian handball player. 

He participated at the 2017 World Men's Handball Championship, as well as at the 2017 Men's Junior World Handball Championship.

References

1996 births
Living people
Macedonian male handball players
Sportspeople from Struga